Zinaspa todara, the silver streaked acacia blue, is a species of lycaenid or blue butterfly found in South Asia.

Description

References

Arhopalini
Butterflies described in 1883
Butterflies of Asia
Taxa named by Frederic Moore